Kargal is a town in the Sagar  of Karnataka has a population of approximately 10,000 people. It was recently declared a "town panchayat" by the government of Karnataka. Kargal is located in Bharangi Hobli, Sagara Taluka. It lies on the banks of River Sharavathi and gained importance after the construction of Linganamakki Dam in the year 1954. The dam is 5 km away from Kargal.

Sight-Seeing in Kargal

Chowdeshwari temple is located in Kargal and Jog Falls is situated on the outskirts. It has a pretty diverse culture and traditions. Many people from different parts of Karnataka visit the temple.

References 

Cities and towns in Shimoga district

pnb:کارگل